George Grant may refer to:

Politics and law
George Davidson Grant (1870–1915), Canadian politician
Paa Grant (George Alfred Grant, 1878–1956), Ghanaian merchant and politician in the Gold Coast
George M. Grant (1897–1982), US Congressman from Alabama
George Grant (British politician) (1924–1984), British Labour MP

Sports
George Franklin Grant (1846–1910), American inventor of the golf tee
George Grant (baseball) (1903–1986), American baseball pitcher
George F. Grant (1906–2008), American fisherman, author, conservationist
Jackie Grant (George Copeland Grant, 1907–1978), Trinidadian cricketer and teacher
George Washington Grant (fl. 1919–1922), American businessman and owner of the Boston Braves of the National League
Bunny Grant (George Leslie Grant), (1940–2018), Jamaican boxer
George Grant (rugby league) (born 1956), Australian rugby league player

Others
George Monro Grant (1835–1902), Canadian principal of Queen's College, Kingston, Ontario
George B. Grant (George Barnard Grant, 1849-1917) American mechanical engineer, inventor, entrepreneur
George A. Grant (1891–1964), American National Park Service photographer
George Grant (philosopher) (George Parkin Grant, 1918–1988), Canadian philosopher and political commentator
George Grant (author) (born 1954), American author, essayist, historian, pastor and educator